Obermaßfeld-Grimmenthal is a municipality in the district Schmalkalden-Meiningen, in Thuringia, Germany.

History
Since 1498, it has been a place of pilgrimage. An early picture of Mary was said to have been miraculous. 1498 a chapel was inaugurated. From the revenue  the Obermaßfelder Werra bridge was built. In 1536, after the Reformation, the pilgrimage  ended. Immediately thereafter, a hospital for the poor was created. After 1945, it was a retirement home, which existed until 1990.

Martin Luther criticism of pilgrimages to Grimmenthal
A chapel at Grimmenthal was erected by a  Würzburg Captain which was dedicated by the Suffragan bishop of Würzburg Prince-bishop Lorenz von Bibra, Georg von Bipolis, on August 24, 1498.  The number of pilgrims grew so much and the money came in so abundantly that a bigger church had to be built by the chapel which was inaugurated on May 1, 1502.  Martin Luther was critical about this:

References

DR. JOHANNES BAIER,  Dr. Martin Luther’s Aufenthalt in Würzburg, 1895, Chapter 5  Bischof Lorenz von Bibra und Dr. Martin Luther. VERLAG UND DRUCK DER STAHEL’SCHEN K. HOF- UND UNIVERSITÄTS- BUCH- UND KUNSTHANDLUNG.

Municipalities in Thuringia
Schmalkalden-Meiningen
Duchy of Saxe-Meiningen